Mugulu Nage is a 2017 Indian Kannada-language romantic comedy film directed and co-produced by Yogaraj Bhat, and jointly produced by Ganesh and Syed Salaam. Ganesh also features in the lead role alongside Apoorva Arora, Nikitha Narayan and Ashika Ranganath. The soundtrack and score is by V. Harikrishna, the cinematography is by Sugnan. The first look of the film was released on 14 February 2017 coinciding the Valentine's Day.

The project marked the third collaboration of Bhat and Ganesh after Mungaru Male (2006) and Gaalipata (2008). The filming began on 8 December 2016 in Bengaluru. Further, shooting took place in Pondicherry, Mysuru, Yaana and Sirsi, Karnataka.

Plot 
Pulakeshi is born with a strange problem of always smiling and not able to cry at all. He meets Vaishali on the day of his college's 50th-year celebration and alumni reunion. Both of them fall in love eventually. Vaishali persuades Pulakeshi to study abroad with her and make a better life for both of them. Pulakeshi agrees and on the day of departure, he realizes his strong love for his family and stays back. Heartbroken, Vaishali leaves alone.

Later, Pulakeshi finds Siri, a guitarist, from Pondicherry. They share common interests and develop a liking for each other. After realising the strong feelings for each other, Pulakeshi asks Siri to marry him. Siri likes living in the moment and rejects the proposal. Having difference of opinion, they decide to part ways for good. Siri tells if Pulakeshi dreams of having a family, he may marry any girl of his choice and that she would live the rest of her life with sweet memories of him. Heartbroken, but still not able to shed tears, Pulakeshi starts his life afresh in Bangalore.

Two years later, his mother finds a girl for him and asks his friends to take him to her place. As soon as Pulakeshi sees her, he likes her. The girl named Charulatha is hardworking and lives in coastal Karnataka. Her father is a cancer patient and mother has already expired. Her sister's marriage is fixed with the son of her father's friend who also suffers from cancer. When Charulatha's sister elopes with her colleague to escape from unwanted marriage, she sacrifices her love and marries her would-be brother-in-law. Heartbroken once again, Pulakeshi finally sheds tears and cries.

At the end, it is shown that Pulakeshi is married to Amulya and becomes a father, of a boy. All his three ex-girlfriends receive this message. Siri genuinely feels happy for him, while Charulatha has mixed reactions.

Cast
 Ganesh as Pulakeshi
 Ashika Ranganath as Vaishali Hande
 Nikitha Narayan as Siri
 Apoorva Arora as Charulatha
 Achyuth Kumar as Pulakeshi's father
 Ananth Nag as Dr. Anant
 Rangayana Raghu as Raghu, Charulatha's father
 Chandan Achar as Pulakeshi's friend
 Niharika
 Dharmanna Kadur as Gopi, Pulakeshi's friend
 Manjunath Hegde as Charulatha's foster father
 Srinivas Prabhu as M. Srinivas, a college Principal
 Rekha Mohan as a musician
 Jaggesh in a cameo as singer
 Amulya in a cameo as Pulakeshi's wife
 Nitesh Nittur in a cameo as the man in the restaurant 
 Sunetra Pandit in a cameo as lady in restaurant

Production

Filming
In August 2016, it was reported that the successful combination of Yogaraj Bhat and Ganesh are teaming up together again for a new romantic venture. While Bhat was taking care of the script, wrote story and take up the direction, Ganesh was cast as the lead actor apart from co-producing the film and V. Harikrishna was chosen to compose the music. On 30 November 2016, the film was reported to have titled as Mugulu Nage. On 8 December 2016, the filming began with the first schedule officially canned at ISRO Layout in Bengaluru. The second schedule was held at Mysuru followed by the third schedule being shot in Puducherry. It was also reported that team expected the filming would be completed by the end of February 2017. However, the shooting was officially concluded in April 2017.

Casting

After signing in Ganesh for the lead role, actress Amulya was signed in for one of the female leads. It was also reported that the film would feature three more leading female characters, with a total of four different romantic tracks. Actresses Nabha Natesh and Nikitha Narayan were approached to play the other lead roles. However, later Nabha was replaced by model turned actress Ashika Ranganath, playing her first role for a film. Apart from these leading actresses. In February 2017, it was announced that actor Jaggesh would be appearing in a special song sequence penned by Bhat himself. Later in March 2017, Bhat made some last-minute changes by replacing Amulya with actress Apoorva Arora since Amulya got engaged and her marriage dates were clashing with the film schedule. Apoorva joined the team on 18 March and shot her scenes at Barkur. It was also reported that Amulya would still make a guest appearance in the film.

Soundtrack

V. Harikrishna scored the film's background and for its soundtrack. The soundtrack, consisting of six tracks, was released starting with the track "Hodi Ombattu" on 11 July 2017 in Hubli and each song in a different city of Karnataka subsequently on every alternate day to "honour each of Harikrishna's songs", who scored for his 100th film. The distribution rights procured by D Beats. The lyrics were written by Yogaraj Bhat and Jayanth Kaikini.

Box Office
The film had a theatrical run of 50 days.

References

External links
 
 

2017 films
2010s Kannada-language films
2017 romantic comedy films
Indian romantic comedy films
Films scored by V. Harikrishna
Films shot in Puducherry
Films directed by Yogaraj Bhat